Five O'Clock World is the second album by the Vogues, released by Co & Ce Records in 1966.

Track listing

References

The Vogues albums
1966 albums